The Casa Stefan Zweig is legally regarded as a private charitable organisation, which was founded in 2006 by a group of interested private donors, to establish a writer's house museum, that is dedicated to the author, in the last residence of Stefan Zweig and his wife in Petrópolis (Brazil).

Background
The house, in which Stefan Zweig and his second wife Lotte resided for 5 months until their joint suicide in February 1942 and where the author had revised his autobiography Die Welt von Gestern and drafted Schachnovelle and his essays about Montaigne, was bought by the association "Casa Stefan Zweig" and the architect Miguel Pinto Guimarães was commissioned with the renovation and the redesign of the house into a museum.

The museum is dedicated to the author.  He, like other artists, scholars, and scientists from Europe had fled to Brazil, due to the Nazi Party takeover in Germany.

The museum will accommodate a library as well as a conference hall.
Beside exhibitions, conferences, competitions, theater and cinema performances, readings and concerts, also cooperations with partner organisations like the Internationale Stefan Zweig Gesellschaft, are planned.

Scientists as well as the general public should have the opportunity, to retrieve online information about Zweig, his work and his literature written in exile. They should furthermore have the opportunity to contribute their own ideas.
For this purpose, a bilingual web page will be created by the Casa Stefan Zweig, which will be updated constantly.

The First president of the association Casa Stefan Zweig is the Brazilian journalist and Stefan Zweig biographer, Alberto Dines.

He was honored for his work and was awarded the Austrian Holocaust Memorial Award (AHMA) which was founded/established by the Austrian Service Abroad in 2006.

Since February 2008 the first Austrian Holocaust Memorial Servant has served within the framework of the Austrian Holocaust Memorial Service at the association Casa Stefan Zweig.

References

 Internationale Stefan Zweig Gesellschaft (in German)

External links
 Casa Stefan Zweig (English)

Houses in Brazil
Literary museums in Brazil
Petrópolis
Stefan Zweig
Museums in Rio de Janeiro (state)
Museums established in 2006
2006 establishments in Brazil